Oriane Jean-François (born 14 August 2001) is a French professional footballer who plays as a midfielder for Division 1 Féminine club Paris Saint-Germain and the France national team.

Club career
On 28 July 2022, Paris Saint-Germain announced the signing of Jean-François on a two-year deal until June 2024.

International career
Jean-François is a former French youth international. She was part of the France under-19 squad which won 2019 UEFA Women's Under-19 Championship.

Jean-François made her senior team debut on 23 October 2020 in a 11–0 win against North Macedonia.

Career statistics

Club

International

Honours
France U19
 UEFA Women's Under-19 Championship: 2019

References

External links
Oriane Jean-François at Paris FC
 
 

2001 births
Living people
People from Saint-Laurent-du-Maroni
French Guianan women's footballers
French women's footballers
France women's youth international footballers
Women's association football midfielders
Paris FC (women) players
Paris Saint-Germain Féminine players
Division 1 Féminine players
France women's international footballers